Quail Island is the third largest island in Western Port (after Phillip Island and French Island). It is uninhabited, the entirety of it being gazetted as Quail Island Nature Conservation Reserve. Its eastern coastline is offshore from Warneet from which it may be accessed by boat. There are two seasonal dams located in the centre. The southern brown bandicoot has been found on the island.

External links
An account of a researcher's visit to Quail Island

Islands of Victoria (Australia)
Western Port
Mornington Peninsula
Uninhabited islands of Australia